Phantasis tenebricosa is a species of beetle in the family Cerambycidae. It was described by Jérôme Sudre and Pierre Téocchi.

References

Phantasini